MV Red Jet 4 is a passenger catamaran ferry operated by Red Funnel on their route from Southampton to Cowes on the Isle of Wight, along with sister ships Red Jet 6 and Red Jet 7.

She was built by North West Bay Ships in Hobart, Tasmania, Australia. After her launch on 20 February 2003 the catamaran was placed aboard a heavy lift ship to be transported to Southampton which arrived on 9 May 2003.  She was officially named by Dame Ellen MacArthur on 18 June 2003 and entered service five days later. During those 5 days the ship was used for a number of excursions including following the Round the Island Race.

On 11 November 2008 Red Jet 4 was used on a number of sightseeing trips to view Queen Elizabeth 2 before it left Southampton for the final time.

Red Jet 4 is featured in the 2008 video game Ship Simulator 2008 with the MV Red Eagle as a sailable ship.

Incidents
On 5 November 2016, while passing Fawley en route to Cowes, Red Jet 4 was in a sidelong collision with a man riding a jet ski.  The man was uninjured and was picked up by a companion on another machine.  Red Jet 4 circled to make sure the rescue was successful before  continuing on its course.

References

External links 

Red Jet 4 at redfunnel.co.uk

Ferries of England
Ferry transport on the Isle of Wight
2003 ships
Ships of Red Funnel
Individual catamarans